Zeidler is a German occupational surname meaning "Beekeeper". Notable people with the surname include:

Alfred Zeidler (born 1909), German SS concentration camp commandant
Carl Zeidler (1908–1942), American mayor
David Zeidler (1918–1998), Australian chemist and industrialist
Eberhard Heinrich Zeidler (1926–2022), German-Canadian architect
Eberhard Hermann Erich Zeidler (1940–2016), German mathematician
Frank Zeidler (1912–2006), American politician
Judith Zeidler (born 1968), German rower
Othmar Zeidler (1850–1911), Austrian chemist
Peter Zeidler (born 1962), German football manager
Susanna Elizabeth Zeidler (1657–c. 1706), German poet
Wolfgang Zeidler (1924–1987), German legal scholar and judge

German-language surnames